= Hulakoppa =

Hulkoppa
- Village
- Nickname: tigers village
- Country: India
- State: Karnataka
- District: Dharwad
- Named for: galagi hulkoppa

Government
  - Type: Panchayat raj
  - Body: Gram panchayat

Area
  - Total: 10 km^{2} (3.9 sq mi)

Population (2011)
  - Total: 1,728
  - Density: 170/km^{2} (450/sq mi)

Languages
  - Official: Kannada
- Time zone: UTC+5:30 (IST)
- ISO 3166 code: IN-KA
- Vehicle registration: KA
- Website: karnataka.gov.in

Hulakoppa is a village in Dharwad district of Karnataka, India.

Hulakoppa is also called as Galagi-Hulakoppa, as it is a commix of Galagi and Hulakoppa small twin villages.

Primary school: Govt. Model Primary School.

Higher Sec School: Smt. Shivarajadevi Composite Pre-University College (SSCPU College).

== Demographics ==
As of the 2011 Census of India there were 346 households in Hulakoppa and a total population of 1,782 consisting of 903 males and 879 females. There were 238 children ages 0–6.
